The Shoshone Mountains, in west central Nevada, make up one of the longest mountain ranges in the state. The range runs in a general north-south direction in Nye and Lander counties.

Named for the Shoshone Indians, the range receives 15 inches or less of precipitation in an average year. About 58% of the mountain range is managed by the Bureau of Land Management, with the Forest Service in charge of almost 42% of the area.  A small part of the range is occupied by the Yomba Indian Reservation and private land.
 
The small community of Ione lies to the west of the range, and the Berlin-Ichthyosaur State Park is situated in the west margin of the range adjacent to Ione Valley just south of the Berlin ghost town. The old mining camp and ghost town of Golden is at the southern end of the range. Nevada Route 722 crosses the range at Railroad Pass just north of Iron Mountain after crossing the Reese River Valley southwest from US 50 near Austin. It then continues in the Smith Creek Valley parallel to the range for 13 miles before turning west to rejoin US 50 near Middlegate across the Destoya Range. Nevada Route 844 crosses the Paradise Range northeast of Gabbs and crosses the Ione Valley to the Berlin-Ichthyosaur State Park area.

Basins or valleys surrounding the range include the Ione Valley and the Smith Creek Valley on the west, the Reese River Valley to the east and the Big Smokey Valley to the south. Surrounding mountain ranges include the Toiyabe Range to the east, the Ravenswood and New Pass ranges to the north, the Desatoya and Paradise ranges to the west and the Cedar Mountains of Mineral County to the southwest.

Named peaks in the range include from south to north: 
Mount Ardivey 
Buffalo Mountain 
South Shoshone Peak 
North Shoshone Peak 
Iron Mountain 
Emigrant Peak 
Mount Airy

Ecology
Vegetation is mostly sagebrush scrub and pinon-juniper.  The Shoshone Mountains are home to mule deer, chipmunks, coyote, elk, and many other small animals such as shrews and squirrels.  At least 21 species of birds can be found in the range during the year, including sparrows, woodpeckers and orioles.

References

 
 Biological Resources Research Center - 

Mountain ranges of Nevada
Mountain ranges of the Great Basin
Mountain ranges of Nye County, Nevada